Brigitte Zarfl (born 11 August 1962) is an Austrian civil servant. She served as Minister for Labour, Social Affairs, Health and Consumer Protection in the Bierlein government.

Zarfl was born in Krems an der Donau in 1962. She studied nutritional science and food technology at the University of Vienna, completing a doctorate in 1996. She joined the social affairs ministry in 1997 under Eleonora Hostasch. She briefly became a delegate to the European Union in 2004 before returning to a role in the ministry in 2006, where she held various leadership roles until her appointment to Brigitte Bierlein's interim cabinet.

References

External links 
 

1962 births
Living people
People from Krems an der Donau
University of Vienna alumni
Health ministers of Austria
Women government ministers of Austria
21st-century Austrian politicians
21st-century Austrian women politicians